Mark Owen Lee (born July 20, 1964) is an American baseball coach and former professional baseball player who was a pitcher in Major League Baseball (MLB). As a minor leaguer he was traded with Rey Palacios from the Detroit Tigers to the Kansas City Royals for Ted Power during the 1988 season.

Lee was hired as the pitching coach of the UCCS Mountain Lions baseball team in 2016 after retiring from a management position with UPS.

References

External links

Major League Baseball pitchers
Kansas City Royals players
Milwaukee Brewers players
Baltimore Orioles players
Omaha Royals players
Denver Zephyrs players
Stockton Ports players
Lakeland Tigers players
Bristol Tigers players
Toledo Mud Hens players
Colorado Springs Sky Sox players
Norfolk Tides players
Richmond Braves players
Rochester Red Wings players
Iowa Cubs players
Oklahoma City 89ers players
Glens Falls Tigers players
Memphis Chicks players
Baseball players from North Dakota
1964 births
Living people
People from Williston, North Dakota
Trinidad State Trojans baseball players
FIU Panthers baseball players
Mat-Su Miners players
Junior college baseball coaches in the United States
Sportspeople from Casper, Wyoming